A constitutional referendum was held in American Samoa on 6 November 2018, alongside general elections. The proposed constitutional amendment would allow the Fono to override the veto of the Governor, a proposal which had previously been rejected by voters in referendums in 2008, 2010, 2012 and 2014. Voters again rejected the measure, with 70% voting against.

Background
On 2 October 2017 the Senate approved the proposal by a vote of 14–1. The House of Representatives approved it unanimously on 11 April 2018.

Results

References

American Samoa
2018 in American Samoa
Referendums in American Samoa